Gyula Gömbös de Jákfa (26 December 1886 – 6 October 1936) was a Hungarian military officer and politician who served as Prime Minister of Hungary from 1 October 1932 to his death.

Background
Gömbös was born in Murga, Tolna County, Kingdom of Hungary, which had a mixed Hungarian and ethnic German population. He was the son of Gyula Gömbös de Jákfa (1858–1921), a member of untitled Hungarian nobility and Maria Weitzel (b.1867). His father was the village schoolmaster. The family belonged to the Hungarian Evangelical (i. e. Lutheran) Church.

Gömbös entered the Austro-Hungarian Army as a cadet in Pécs and quickly became a member of the officer corps, serving as a captain during World War I. In the army, Gömbös became a staunch advocate of Hungary's gaining independence from Austria and a bitter critic of the Habsburgs.

After World War I ended, and Hungary split from Austria, Gömbös joined conservative Hungarian forces in Szeged that were unwilling to support the communist Béla Kun, who had seized control of Hungary in 1919. Gömbös formed his own paramilitary group, the Hungarian National Defence Association (Magyar Országos Véderő Egylet, or MOVE).  Gömbös became a close ally of Miklós Horthy, the leader of the anticommunist government in Szeged, and played a leading role in organizing Horthy’s army. For his services, Gömbös was made minister of defence in the Szeged government.

After the Hungarian communist government had been ousted in August 1919, Gömbös helped direct the purge of communists from Hungarian society. Gömbös also supported certain political actions against Hungary's Jews, many of whom had helped the communists.

Rightward

Gömbös had been a Smallholder before the war but veered sharply to the right in the upheaval following the breakup of Austria-Hungary. After Miklós Horthy was made regent of Hungary in 1920, Gömbös became the primary leader of Hungary’s emerging nationalist movement, which was gaining some support from the people in response to the brief period of communist rule and the signing of the Treaty of Trianon, which had resulted in Hungary losing two thirds of its territory to neighboring nations.

Despite some disagreements with Horthy, Gömbös was active in the widespread purge of Hungarian communists and later organized mass military opposition to the plan of the Habsburg pretender, Charles IV, to regain his throne in 1921, a move that kept Horthy firmly in control of Hungary. Later that year, Gömbös became one of the primary leaders of the opposition to Prime Minister István Bethlen. In 1929, Gömbös was made a major general and was appointed Minister of Defense in the Bethlen government by Horthy.

Prime minister

In 1932, Horthy appointed Gömbös prime minister; Gömbös, in turn, acceded to Horthy's urging not to seek new elections. Upon taking office, Gömbös publicly recanted his previous antipathy to Jews. The country's Jewish political leadership, under Béla Szántó, supported the appointment of Gömbös and his programs in exchange for Gömbös promising not to enact any racially-motivated laws and not to cause economic harm to the Jews through his general policies. Gömbös kept those promises. 

As prime minister, Gömbös was very active in international affairs by seeking support for revising the Treaty of Trianon and pursuing trade deals aimed at reviving the Depression-afflicted economy. One of his major goals was to align Hungary into an Axis with Italy and Austria. In 1933, Gömbös flew to Italy and visited Benito Mussolini. Mussolini conveyed to Gömbös his approval regarding the revision of the Treaty of Trianon. Also, Mussolini promised Gömbös Italy’s aid if Hungary went to war with Yugoslavia and Romania in an attempt to regain Hungary’s former territory from those nations.

Gömbös also formed, with rather greater reluctance, an alliance with Germany. When Adolf Hitler became Chancellor of Germany, Gömbös was the first foreign head of government to visit the Nazi leader. Shortly after, Gömbös signed a major trade agreement with Germany in the hope of reducing Hungary's unemployment rate as the 1930s progressed.

That amity, however, failed to endure. Hitler considered Gömbös to be far too pro-Jewish and made it clear to Gömbös that his support of Hungary had a price. The German dictator voiced willingness to take Hungary's side in any effort that Hungary carried out to regain land from Czechoslovakia, but he would not support Hungary against the territorial ambitions of either Romania or Yugoslavia. Unlike Mussolini, Hitler also resented Gömbös's plans to expand the size and power of the Hungarian military.

Death in office
However, Gömbös never lived to see his ambitious plans come to fruition.  Gömbös, after a long illness, died of testicular cancer in Munich on 6 October 1936.

Burial
Gömbös was buried at Kerepesi Cemetery among exceptional circumstances; his funeral procession was attended by hundreds of thousands of Hungarians, and his catafalque was visited by many dignitaries because he was the head of the government.

See also 

 History of Hungary

References

Further reading

External links

 A Gömbös-kormányról, bibl.u-szeged.hu; retrieved 12 June 2018.
 Gömbös Gyula Gergely Jenő írása], mult-kor.hu; retrieved 12 June 2018. 
 Az evangélikus Gömbös Gyula, lutheran.hu; retrieved 12 June 2018.
 

1886 births
1936 deaths
People from Tolna County
People from the Kingdom of Hungary
Hungarian Lutherans
Prime Ministers of Hungary
Foreign ministers of Hungary
Defence ministers of Hungary
Far-right politics in Hungary
Conservatism in Hungary
Fascism in Hungary
Hungarian fascists
Austro-Hungarian military personnel of World War I
Hungarian anti-communists
Deaths from testicular cancer
Deaths from cancer in Germany
Recipients of the Order of the White Eagle (Poland)
Unity Party (Hungary) politicians
Fascist politicians